The 1948 CCUNC Owls football team was an American football team that represented the Charlotte Center of the University of North Carolina or CCUNC (now known as the University of North Carolina at Charlotte) as an independent during the 1948 college football season. In their first season under head coach Carroll Blackwell, the team compiled a 0–5 record. The CCUNC program was disbanded prior to the 1949 season as there were not enough players to field the team. Football was reinstated for the 2013 season as the Charlotte 49ers.

Schedule

References

CCUNC
Charlotte 49ers football seasons
College football winless seasons
CCUNC Owls football